Black Warrior is the name of a Confederate two-masted schooner that participated in the defense of Roanoke Island in North Carolina during the Civil War. Its brief wartime career ended with its burning at Elizabeth City, North Carolina.

Prewar history 

The Black Warrior was originally named the M.C. Etheridge.  Built in Plymouth, North Carolina, in 1859, she was owned and operated by J. Brown. Initially registered for overseas trade, the Etheridge was enrolled for interstate trade in 1860. In October of that year her documentation was changed back for overseas trade. (Enrollment abstracts, NA)

Civil War Service

The Black Warrior was acquired by the Confederate Navy in 1862 and was armed with two 32-pounder guns. Under the command of Lieutenant F. M. Harris, the schooner was part of a nine-gunboat naval squadron tasked with the defense of the northeastern North Carolina sounds. She was at anchor in Croatan Sound under the guns of Fort Forrest when a Union army/navy force under the command of General Ambrose Burnside arrived on February 6, 1862 to invade Roanoke Island. Burnside sent his forces to destroy the remains of the Southern Mosquito Fleet still operating in North Carolina's sounds. Because of her limited mobility and the fact that the Union landing site was well to the south of the schooner, she took no action against the invasion force. The other gunboats of the Confederate squadron engaged in a futile attempt to disrupt the landings on February 7. Late in the day the Black Warrior was detailed to salvage what guns and ammunition she could from the partially sunk gunboat Curlew. That evening the squadron retreated to Elizabeth City to obtain more ammunition. One of the gunboats, the Ellis, took the Black Warrior in tow while the remainder of the squadron made their way overnight to Elizabeth City. (Parker 1883: 247ff)

Two of the Confederates gunboats steamed back to assist the garrison at Roanoke Island but turned around when it became obvious that the island had fallen.  However, gunboats were sighted by the Union fleet and pursued back to Elizabeth City.  It was decided to anchor Black Warrior near the fort that guarded the approaches to Elizabeth City while the rest of the gunboat squadron formed a line abreast across the channel opposite the fort.  On February 10 the Union gunboat squadron, consisting of 14 vessels, simply bypassed the fort and Black Warrior to attack the other Confederate gunboats. Two Confederate gunboats escaped; the rest were either captured or sunk in what became known as the Battle of Elizabeth City.(Parker 1883: 258)

The Black Warrior was initially ignored by the Union fleet, but when she opened fire the USS Whitehead turned and closed in to attack. The crew abandoned ship, setting fire to the Black Warrior and escaping ashore to avoid capture. The crew of the Whitehead attempted to extinguish the fire, but found it was too far advanced and had to withdraw. (ORN 1922: 617)

Postwar
In 2000 the wreck site was mapped and in 2001 a gun carriage was retrieved for display at the Museum of the Albemarle.  The wreck was listed on the National Register of Historic Places in 2018.

References

See also 
 Schooner
Records of the Bureau of Marine Inspection and Navigation, Certificates of Enrollments issued at North Carolina Ports 1815–1911, Abstracts, Record Group 41, National Archives, Washington, DC.
John G. Barrett, The Civil War in North Carolina, University of North Carolina Press, 1963.
William Parker, Recollections of a Naval Officer, Naval Institute Press, 1883, 1985.
Battle of Elizabeth City. Retrieved October 5, 2007.
Official Records of the Union and Confederate Navies in the War of the Rebellion, Series 1 v6, GPO Washington DC, 1922.
List of all Union and Confederate Ships in the Civil War

Gunboats of the Confederate States Navy
1859 ships
Shipwrecks of the American Civil War
Maritime incidents in February 1862
National Register of Historic Places in Camden County, North Carolina
Shipwrecks on the National Register of Historic Places in North Carolina